Gabriel Fulcher (born 27 November 1969) is a former Irish rugby union international player who played as a lock.
He played for the Ireland team from 1994 to 1998, winning 20 caps. He was a member of the Ireland squad at the 1995 Rugby World Cup.

References

External links
ESPN Profile

1969 births
Living people
Irish rugby union players
Ireland international rugby union players
Rugby union locks